Ģirts Ķesteris (born 14 February 1964) is a Latvian actor. He is employed by the Valmiera Drama Theatre. In 1994 he won the Spēlmaņu nakts gada aktieris award for best actor.

Selected filmography

References

Living people
1964 births
Latvian male stage actors
Latvian male television actors
Latvian male film actors
People from Valmiera
20th-century Latvian male actors
21st-century Latvian male actors